Kurrowah is a rural locality in the Toowoomba Region, Queensland, Australia.

History 
The locality takes its name from a heavily timbered landholding on the Condamine River, resumed from the Yandilla pastoral run and selected by Brodrib and Carter in about 1870.

Road infrastructure
Millmerran–Cecil Plains Road runs through from south to north.

References 

Toowoomba Region
Localities in Queensland